

Awards

Monarchies

Luxembourgish Grand-Ducal Family 

 Henri, Grand Duke of Luxembourg
  / 
 Co-Grand Master of the Order of the Gold Lion of the House of Nassau
 
 Grand Master of the military and civil Order of Adolphe of Nassau
 Grand Master of the Order of the Oak Crown
 Grand Master of the Order of Merit of the Grand Duchy of Luxembourg
 Maria Teresa, Grand Duchess of Luxembourg
  / : Knight of the Order of the Gold Lion of the House of Nassau
 Guillaume, Hereditary Grand Duke of Luxembourg
 Effectively
  / : Knight of the Order of the Gold Lion of the House of Nassau (by birth) as a son of one of the two Heads of the House
 : Grand Cross of Order of the Oak Crown
 in right - as Prince of Luxembourg - but mute
 : Grand Cross of Order of Adolphe of Nassau (by birth, on 18 years old)
 Prince Félix of Luxembourg
 Effectively (by birth) as a son of one of the two Heads of the House
  / : Knight of the Order of the Gold Lion of the House of Nassau 
 in right - as Prince of Luxembourg - but mute
 : Grand Cross of Order of Adolphe of Nassau (by birth, on 18 years old) as Prince of Luxembourg
 Prince Louis of Luxembourg
 Effectively (by birth) as a son of one of the two Heads of the House
  / : Knight of the Order of the Gold Lion of the House of Nassau 
 in right - as Prince of Luxembourg - but mute
 : Grand Cross of Order of Adolphe of Nassau (by birth, on 18 years old)
 Princess Alexandra of Luxembourg
 Effectively
  / : Lady of Order of the Gold Lion of the House of Nassau (23 June 2009) as a daughter of one of the two Heads
 in right - as Princess of Luxembourg - but mute
 : Grand Cross of Order of Adolphe of Nassau (by birth, on 18 years old) as Princess of Luxembourg
 Prince Sébastien of Luxembourg
 Effectively (by birth) as a son of one of the two Heads of the House
  / : Knight of the Order of the Gold Lion of the House of Nassau 
 in right - as Prince of Luxembourg - but mute
 : Grand Cross of Order of Adolphe of Nassau (by birth, on 18 years old) as Prince of Luxembourg
 Archduchess Marie Astrid of Austria: Grand Cross of Order of Adolphe of Nassau (by birth, on 18 years old) as Princess of Luxembourg
 Archduke Carl Christian of Austria: Grand Cross of Order of Adolphe of Nassau
 Princess Margaretha of Liechtenstein: Grand Cross of Order of Adolphe of Nassau (by birth, on 18 years old) as Princess of Luxembourg
 Prince Nikolaus of Liechtenstein: Grand Cross of the Order of Adolphe of Nassau
 Prince Jean of Luxembourg
  / : Knight of the Order of the Gold Lion of the House of Nassau (by birth) as a son of one of the two Heads of the House
 : Grand Cross of Order of Adolphe of Nassau (by birth, on 18 years old) as Prince of Luxembourg
 Prince Guillaume of Luxembourg
  / : Knight of the Order of the Gold Lion of the House of Nassau (by birth) as a son of one of the two Heads of the House
 : Grand Cross of Order of Adolphe of Nassau (by birth, on 18 years old) as Prince of Luxembourg
 Princess Sibilla of Luxembourg: Grand Cross of Order of Adolphe of Nassau

British Royal Family 

 Queen Elizabeth II:  1972 - Knight of the Order of the Gold Lion of the House of Nassau
 Charles: 1972 – - Grand Cross of the Order of the Oak Crown
 Anne, Princess Royal: 1972: Grand Cross of the Order of the Oak Crown

Norwegian Royal Family 

 Harald V of Norway
 Grand Cross of the Order of Adolph of Nassau°
 Knight of the Order of the Gold Lion of the House of Nassau°
 Medal to commemorate the wedding of Grand Duke Jean and Grand Duchess Josephine-Charlotte°
 Queen Sonja of Norway
 Grand Cross of the Order of Adolph of Nassau°
 Knight of the Order of the Gold Lion of the House of Nassau°
 Haakon, Crown Prince of Norway: Grand Cross of the Order of Adolph of Nassau °
 Mette-Marit, Crown Princess of Norway: Grand Cross of the Order of Adolphe of Nassau°
 Princess Märtha Louise of Norway: Grand Cross of the Order of Adolph of Nassau°
 Princess Astrid of Norway: Grand Cross of the Order of Adolphe of Nassau°

Swedish Royal Family 

Sources: 
 Carl XVI Gustaf of Sweden: Knight of the Order of the Gold Lion of the House of Nassau
 Queen Silvia of Sweden: Knight of the Order of the Gold Lion of the House of Nassau
 Victoria, Crown Princess of Sweden: Grand Cross of the Order of Adolphe of Nassau
 Prince Carl Philip, Duke of Värmland: Grand Cross of the Order of Adolphe of Nassau (April 2008)
 Princess Madeleine, Duchess of Hälsingland and Gästrikland: Grand Cross of the Order of Adolphe of Nassau (April 2008)

Danish Royal Family 

 Margrethe II of Denmark: Knight of the Order of the Gold Lion of the House of Nassau°
 Frederik, Crown Prince of Denmark: Grand Cross of the Order of Adolphe of Nassau°
 Prince Joachim of Denmark: Grand-Cross of the Order of Adolphe of Nassau°
 Alexandra, Countess of Frederiksborg: Grand Cross of the Order of Adolphe of Nassau 
 Princess Benedikte of Denmark: Grand Cross of the Order of Adolphe of Nassau°

Dutch Royal Family 

 King Willem-Alexander of the Netherlands:  Grand Cross of the Order of Adolphe of Nassau & of the Order of the Oak Crown
 Queen Máxima of the Netherlands:  Grand Cross of the Order of Adolphe of Nassau 
 Princess Beatrix of the Netherlands: Grand Cross of the Order of Adolphe of Nassau & of the Order of the Oak Crown
 Princess Margriet of the Netherlands: Grand Cross of the Order of Adolphe of Nassau  & of the Order of the Oak Crown
 Pieter van Vollenhoven: Grand Cross of the Order of Adolphe of Nassau  & of the Order of the Oak Crown
 Rem: Order of the Gold Lion of the House of Nassau
 King Willem-Alexander of the Netherlands: Co-Grand Master of the Order
 Princess Beatrix of the Netherlands: former Co-Grand Master of the Order 
 Knights: Friso and Constantijn (by birth)

Belgian Royal Family 

 King Philippe: Knight of the Order of the Gold Lion of the House of Nassau (1999) 
 Queen Mathilde: Grand Cross of the Order of Adolphe of Nassau (2007)
 King Albert II:  Knight of the Order of the Gold Lion of the House of Nassau 
 Queen Paola: Knight of the Order of the Gold Lion of the House of Nassau
 Princess Astrid & Prince Lorenz: Grand-Cross of the Order of Adolphe of Nassau (1999)

Spanish Royal Family 

 Juan Carlos I of Spain: Knight of the Order of the Gold Lion of the House of Nassau
 Queen Sofía of Spain: Lady of the Order of the Gold Lion of the House of Nassau
 King Felipe VI: Grand Cross of the Order of Adolphe of Nassau (2001)
 Infanta Elena, Duchess of Lugo: Grand Cross of the Order of Adolphe of Nassau (2001)
 Jaime de Marichalar: Grand Cross of the Order of the Oak Crown (2001)
 Infanta Cristina: Grand Cross of the Order of Adolphe of Nassau (2001)
 Iñaki Urdangarin: Grand Cross of the Order of the Oak Crown (2001)

Thai Royal Family 

 Queen Sirikit of Thailand: Knight of the Order of the Gold Lion of the House of Nassau (1960)

Japanese Imperial Family 

 Emperor Akihito: Knight of the Order of the Gold Lion of the House of Nassau
 Empress Michiko: Knight of the Order of the Gold Lion of the House of Nassau

Former monarchies

Greek Royal Family 

 Constantine II of Greece: Knight of the Order of the Gold Lion of the House of Nassau

Republics

Austria  
 President Heinz Fischer: Knight of the Order of the Gold Lion of the House of Nassau (2013) 
 Margit Fischer, his wife: Grand Cross of the Order of Adolphe of Nassau (2013)

Estonia  
 President Arnold Rüütel: Great Cross of the Order of Adolphe of Nassau (2003)

Finland 
 President Tarja Halonen: Dame of the Order of the Gold Lion of the House of Nassau (November 2008)
 Pentti Arajärvi, her husband: Grand Cross of the Order of Adolphe of Nassau (November 2008)

Mali 
 President Amadou Toumani Touré: Grand Cross of the Order of Adolphe of Nassau (November 2005)

Turkey  
 President Abdullah Gül: Knight of the Order of the Gold Lion of the House of Nassau (November 2013)

Portugal 
 President António Ramalho Eanes (1976–1986): Knight of the Order of the Gold Lion of the House of Nassau (2 January 1985)
 Maria Manuela Neto Portugal Ramalho EANES, his wife:  Grand Cross of the Order of Adolphe of Nassau (2 January 1985)
 President Jorge Sampaio (1996–2006): Knight of the Order of the Gold Lion of the House of Nassau (15 September 2010, after presidency)
 Maria José Rodrigues Ritta, his wife: Grand Cross of the Order of Adolphe of Nassau (15 September 2010)
 President Aníbal Cavaco Silva (2006 - ):
 Grand Cross of the Order of the Oak Crown  (4 February 1991, as a prime minister)
 Knight of the Order of the Gold Lion of the House of Nassau  (9 September 2010, as a president)
 Maria Cavaco Silva, his wife: Grand Cross of the Order of Adolphe of Nassau (9 September 2010)

References 

Orders, decorations, and medals of Luxembourg
Luxembourg